Sergej Jakirović (born 23 December 1976) is a Bosnian professional football manager and former player who is the current manager of Croatian Football League club Rijeka.

Club career
Jakirović played in the Croatian Prva HNL for Neretva, Istra, Kamen Ingrad, NK Zagreb and Rijeka.

International career
Jakirović made his debut for Bosnia and Herzegovina in an August 2005 friendly match away against Estonia and has earned a total of 5 caps, scoring no goals. His final international was a February 2006 friendly against Japan.

Managerial career

Early career
Between 2017 and 2018, Jakirović managed Sesvete in the Croatian second division.

On 20 June 2018, Jakirović was appointed manager of Prva HNL club Gorica, which he led to fifth place in the 2018–19 league season. On 24 February 2020, following a 6–0 loss to Hajduk Split, he was sacked by the club.

On 23 April 2020, Jakirović was named new manager of Slovenian PrvaLiga club Maribor, replacing Darko Milanič. He was sacked on 29 August 2020 after getting eliminated by the semi-professional Northern Irish team Coleraine in the 2020–21 UEFA Europa League first qualifying round.

Zrinjski Mostar
On 28 December 2020, Jakirović became the new manager of Bosnian Premier League club Zrinjski Mostar, signing a three-and-a-half year contract with the club.

In his first game in charge, Zrinjski beat Krupa in a league match on 27 February 2021. He oversaw his first loss as Zrinjski manager in a Bosnian Cup game against Sarajevo, played on 10 March 2021. 

On 20 January 2022, Jakirović signed a two-and-a-half year contract extension until 2024. After beating Radnik Bijeljina on 19 March 2022, Zrinjski broke the all-time Bosnian Premier League record with 13 consecutive victories, overpassing the previous record of 12 victories set by Željezničar in the 2011–12 season. On 16 April 2022, he managed Zrinjski to a 4–0 win against Sarajevo, clinching the club's record seventh league title seven rounds before the end of the season.

After getting eliminated from the 2022–23 UEFA Champions League first qualifying round by Moldovan club Sheriff Tiraspol, Jakirović led Zrinjski to the 2022–23 UEFA Europa Conference League play-off round, where they got eliminated by Slovak club Slovan Bratislava following a penalty shoot-out, missing out on a chance to play in the group stage.

On 29 November 2022, the board of Zrinjski confirmed that Jakirović had left the club, as he was set to sign a contract with Croatian top division side Rijeka.

Rijeka
One day after his Zrinjski departure was confirmed, Jakirović signed a two-and-a-half year contract with Rijeka with an option for another year. He made his debut on 21 January 2023, when Rijeka drew 1–1 away against Osijek.

On 28 January, Jakirović won his first match as Rijeka manager after a 2–1 win over Šibenik. After a four-game winning streak, he suffered his first defeat as the club's manager on 25 February 2023 in a 1–0 loss to Slaven Belupo.

Personal life
Born in Mostar, Jakirović has both Bosnian and Croatian citizenship.

Managerial statistics

Honours

Player
Spartak Trnava
Slovak Cup: 1997–98

CSKA Sofia
Bulgarian Cup: 2005–06
Bulgarian Supercup: 2006

Manager
Zrinjski Mostar
Bosnian Premier League: 2021–22

References

External links

Sergej Jakirović at hrnogomet.com 

1976 births
Living people
Sportspeople from Mostar
Croats of Bosnia and Herzegovina
Association football central defenders
Association football midfielders
Bosnia and Herzegovina footballers
Bosnia and Herzegovina international footballers
NK Neretva players
RNK Split players
FC Spartak Trnava players
NK Istra players
NK Korotan Prevalje players
NK Kamen Ingrad players
NK Zagreb players
PFC CSKA Sofia players
ASKÖ Pasching players
SK Austria Kärnten players
HNK Rijeka players
SV Spittal players
NK Lučko players
NK Sesvete players
Croatian Football League players
First Football League (Croatia) players
Second Football League (Croatia) players
Slovak Super Liga players
Slovenian PrvaLiga players
First Professional Football League (Bulgaria) players
Austrian Football Bundesliga players
Austrian Regionalliga players
Bosnia and Herzegovina expatriate footballers
Expatriate footballers in Slovakia
Bosnia and Herzegovina expatriate sportspeople in Slovakia
Expatriate footballers in Slovenia
Bosnia and Herzegovina expatriate sportspeople in Slovenia
Expatriate footballers in Bulgaria
Bosnia and Herzegovina expatriate sportspeople in Bulgaria
Expatriate footballers in Austria
Bosnia and Herzegovina expatriate sportspeople in Austria
Bosnia and Herzegovina football managers
ND Gorica managers
NK Maribor managers
HŠK Zrinjski managers
HNK Rijeka managers
Croatian Football League managers
Premier League of Bosnia and Herzegovina managers
Bosnia and Herzegovina expatriate football managers
Expatriate football managers in Slovenia